Rafael Villagómez Jr. (born 10 November 2001) is a Mexican race car driver who is currently competing in the 2023 FIA Formula 3 Championship for Van Amersfoort Racing. He won the Richard Mille Young Talent Academy competition in 2019.

Career summary

Lower formulae 
In 2020 Villagómez made his car racing debut in the French F4 Championship, whilst also competing part-time with Fortec Motorsport in the F4 British Championship. He achieved a second-place finish at Le Castellet and, with 121 points, finished sixth in the championship.

In the British series he scored a maiden podium finish with third in only his second race. However, in the following races the Mexican was unable to replicate this result and finished eleventh in the standings, only ahead of four other drivers.

Euroformula Open Championship

2020 
Villagómez participated in the final round of the 2020 Euroformula Open Championship at the Circuit de Catalunya with Drivex as a guest driver.

2021 

He joined Van Amersfoort Racing for the 2021 season.

FIA Formula 3 Championship

2021 

In 2021 the Mexican made his debut in the FIA Formula 3 Championship for HWA Racelab, racing alongside Matteo Nannini and Oliver Rasmussen, becoming the first driver from Mexico to compete in FIA F3. Unfortunately for Villagómez, he was unable to score any points throughout the campaign, finishing 29th in the standings with a best race result of 13th. He drove for Van Amersfoort Racing in the post-season test.

2022 
The following year, Villagómez returned to Formula 3, partnering Franco Colapinto and Reece Ushijima at Van Amersfoort Racing. In Imola, he achieved his first ever points finish. At the end of the season, he partook in the post-season test remaining with Van Amersfoort Racing in September.

2023 
The Mexican returned to the championship in 2023, once again driving for Van Amersfoort Racing. He is also set to compete in the 2023 Formula Regional Middle East Championship with VAR before the start of his main campaign.

FIA Formula 2 Championship 
Villagómez was invited to partake in the 2022 F2 post-season testing with Van Amersfoort Racing.

Karting record

Karting career summary

Racing record

Racing career summary

† As Villagómez was a guest driver, he was ineligible to score points.
* Season still in progress.

Complete F4 British Championship results
(key) (Races in bold indicate pole position) (Races in italics indicate fastest lap)

Complete French F4 Championship results
(key) (Races in bold indicate pole position) (Races in italics indicate fastest lap)

Complete Euroformula Open Championship results 
(key) (Races in bold indicate pole position; races in italics indicate points for the fastest lap of top ten finishers)

Complete F3 Asian Championship results
(key) (Races in bold indicate pole position) (Races in italics indicate the fastest lap of top ten finishers)

Complete FIA Formula 3 Championship results 
(key) (Races in bold indicate pole position; races in italics indicate points for the fastest lap of top ten finishers)

* Season still in progress.

Complete Formula Regional Middle East Championship results
(key) (Races in bold indicate pole position) (Races in italics indicate fastest lap)

* Season still in progress.

References

External links
 
 

2001 births
Living people
Mexican racing drivers
British F4 Championship drivers
French F4 Championship drivers
Euroformula Open Championship drivers
F3 Asian Championship drivers
FIA Formula 3 Championship drivers
Fortec Motorsport drivers
Auto Sport Academy drivers
Drivex drivers
HWA Team drivers
Van Amersfoort Racing drivers
Karting World Championship drivers
Pinnacle Motorsport drivers
BlackArts Racing drivers
Formula Regional Middle East Championship drivers